The Military Spouses Residency Relief Act (MSRRA) signed into law on November 11, 2009, was originally introduced by Congressman John Carter (Texas) during the 110th United States Congress.  The MSRRA was written to amend the Servicemembers Civil Relief Act (SCRA) to include protection of military spouses, with regards to voting, property and taxes, and provide equitable treatment of military spouses.

Congressman Carter sponsored the bill after two military spouses, Army spouse Rebecca Noah Poynter and Navy spouse Joanna Williamson, approached him about residency concerns resulting from military moves and increasing deployments due to the War on Terrorism.  Military spouses were required to become a resident of the state where they resided, in contrast to service members that could maintain a home state.

During the bill's life in the 110th Congress, H.R. 6070 had 72 co-sponsors.  It is believed that the bill could have passed during the 110th Congress but due to the housing crisis in 2008 it was quickly dismissed.

On February 25, 2009, of the 111th United States Congress, Congressman Carter reintroduced MSRRA; H.R. 1182.

Senator Richard Burr introduced the companion bill, S. 475, to the Senate Committee of Veterans' Affairs on February 25, 2009.  Rebecca Poynter testified at the Senate Committee of Veterans' Affairs in April.  May 7, 2009 MSRRA passed a Senate floor vote.

Supporting Organizations

During the Congressional bill process, Military Officers Association of America (MOAA) was the lead veteran organization with these organizations also in support:
 American Legion
 Veterans of Foreign Wars
 Iraq and Afghanistan Veterans of America
 Air Force Sergeants Association
 Paralyzed Veterans of America
 AMVETS
 Vietnam Veterans of America

Enactment

During the bills life in the House, H.R. 1182 had 208 co-sponsors.  It was on its way for full House Veterans' Affairs Committee vote when S. 475 was signed into law.

The bill S. 475 had 44 co-sponsors.  It passed the Senate Veterans Affairs Committee and passed during House floor debate on November 2, 2009.

A team from the Military Spouse Business Association, Rebecca Noah Poynter, Joanna Williamson, Rikki Winters, Lynn Carroll, Lanette Lepper, and Kara Acosta, led a support campaign to include a Facebook site of military families.  The grassroots and virtual Facebook social media campaign built to 22,000 allowing public support from military families across the country to be expressed to legislators.  Military Spouses and supporters across the nation (Pete Seidler, Cynthia Wass Shepard, Carolyn Duft LeVering, Susan Cross Johnston, David Etheridge, Rick Trevino) volunteered virtually to increase support by contacting Senate and House Offices, and answering questions.

On Veterans Day, November 11, 2009, President Barack Obama signed .

The President of the United States, Barack Obama, issued a press release after he signed the bill.  The Military Times called the bill "landmark legislation" for military families.

Sponsors 

 Congressman John Carter
 Senator Richard Burr
 Senator Dianne Feinstein

Support 

 MOAA.
 Military Spouse Business Association
 AMVETS.
 VFW.
 The American Legion
 Paralyzed Veterans of America
 Iraq and Afghanistan Veterans of America.
 Air Force Association
 Vietnam Veterans of America.
 Air Force Sergeants Association
 Military Spouses Coalition

Update

Senator Jon Tester introduced the Veterans Benefits and Transition Act of 2018, S. 2248, during the 115th United States Congress.  The bill that became Public Law No. 115-407
, again amends the Servicemembers Civil Relief Act (SCRA) to provide expanded protections for military spouses with regards to voting and taxes.

References

United States federal defense and national security legislation
United States federal judiciary legislation
Proposed legislation of the 110th United States Congress
Military personnel
United States federal legislation articles without infoboxes
Acts of the 111th United States Congress